The 2010 South American Under-20 Women's Football Championship was the 4th instance of the South American Under-20 Women Championship. It was held from March 3 to 17 in Bucaramanga, Colombia. All matches were played at the Estadio Alfonso Lopez. The winners, Brazil, and the runners-up, Colombia, qualified for 2010 FIFA U-20 Women's World Cup held in Germany.

Group stage

Group A

All times are local (UTC-5).

Group B

All times are local (UTC-5).

Knockout stage
The winners of the two semifinal matches will qualify directly to the 2010 FIFA U-20 Women's World Cup held in Germany.

Semi-finals

Third place match

Final

Top scorer
Alanna from Brazil won the top-scorer award with 7 goals. She led Paraguay's Ana Fleitas who scored 6 goals.

References

External links
 Official Site

2010
Women
International association football competitions hosted by Colombia
CON
South
2010 in youth association football